Aruakandi Natakhola Barokhola High School is situated at the joined position of three villages named Aruakandi, Natakhola, and Barokhola in Kadambari Union, Rajoir Upazila, Madaripur District, Bangladesh.

References

Schools in Madaripur District